Emmalocera neotomella is a species of snout moth in the genus Emmalocera. It is found in New South Wales, Australia.

References

Moths described in 1879
Emmalocera